The Grand Army Plaza station is a local station on the IRT Eastern Parkway Line of the New York City Subway. It is located in Park Slope, Brooklyn, underneath Flatbush Avenue at its intersection with Plaza Street West and St. Johns Place, on the northwest side of Grand Army Plaza. It is served by the 2 train at all times, the 3 train at all times except late nights, and the 4 train during late nights.

History 
The Bergen Street, Grand Army Plaza, and Eastern Parkway–Brooklyn Museum stations opened on October 9, 1920. Service on the IRT Eastern Parkway Line had been extended from Atlantic Avenue to Utica Avenue in August 1920, but the three stations were not ready to open with the rest of the line. This extension was part of an expansion of the subway system known as the Dual Contracts which built not only IRT lines in Brooklyn but also those for the BMT. The BMT Brighton Line was already in use at the time but used trackage that is now part of the Franklin Avenue Shuttle; the opening of the subway line beneath Flatbush Avenue provided a more direct route to Downtown Brooklyn and, eventually, Manhattan.

The construction of the station and tunnels resulted in the removal of Frederic W. Darlington's 1897 Electric Fountain from the center of Grand Army Plaza, which was dug up for the cut-and-cover construction and replaced with a grass oval. Construction began on a new fountain, known as the Bailey Fountain, in 1928, and it was completed in 1932.

During the 1964–1965 fiscal year, the platforms at Grand Army Plaza, along with those at four other stations on the Eastern Parkway Line, were lengthened to 525 feet to accommodate a ten-car train of 51-foot IRT cars.

Station layout 

At platform level, Grand Army Plaza has a simple island platform layout with two tracks. Southbound (eastern Brooklyn-bound) trains use track E1 while northbound (Manhattan-bound) trains use track E4. Underneath the platform are four tracks, the center two, A4 (north) and A3 (south) carrying the BMT Brighton Line with tracks E2 and E3 carrying southbound and northbound express IRT Eastern Parkway Line trains on either side of the Brighton Line tracks, respectively. These track designations are only displayed on small emergency placards on either end of the platform for use by train and emergency personnel; they are not used in everyday conversation.

The only mosaic in the Grand Army Plaza station is a small "P". A permanent art installation in the station's entrances and mezzanine entitled Wings for the IRT: The Irresistible Romance of Travel was created in 1995 by Jane Greengold, who used the station regularly when she lived in Park Slope. The bronze and terra cotta pieces of art are modeled on the original Interborough Rapid Transit Company logo, and alludes to the Soldiers' and Sailors' Arch in the plaza above with its Winged Victories. The MTA's Arts for Transit program held an opening ceremony for the artwork on June 19, 1997.

Exits
The station has four entrances and exits, all of which are staircases:
 2 on the northeast corner of Flatbush Avenue and Plaza Street East
 1 on the southwest corner of Flatbush Avenue and Plaza Street West
 1 on the southeast corner of Flatbush Avenue and Plaza Street West

References

External links 

 www.nycsubway.org:
 Brooklyn IRT: Grand Army Plaza
 Brooklyn IRT: Map 2, Brooklyn IRT Dual Contracts (includes current and former track configurations, and provisions for future connections)
 Wings for the IRT, The Irresistable  Romance of Travel Artwork by Jane Greengold (1993)
 MTA's Arts For Transit — Grand Army Plaza (IRT Eastern Parkway Line)

IRT Eastern Parkway Line stations
Park Slope
New York City Subway stations in Brooklyn
Railway stations in the United States opened in 1920
1920 establishments in New York City
Prospect Heights, Brooklyn
Grand Army Plaza